Jahangirabad Cantonment is located in Bogra, is a Cantonment near Bogra city Bypass road. It is the HQ of 11th artillery brigade.

Education 
 Jahangirabad Cantonment Public School

See also 
 Comilla Cantonment
 Alikadam Cantonment
 Savar Cantonment

References 

Bangladesh Army
Cantonments of Bangladesh